This is a listing of the horses that finished in either first, second, or third place and the number of starters in the Primonetta Stakes, an American stakes race for fillies and mares three years old and older at six furlongs (6 furlongs) on the dirt at Pimlico Race Course in Baltimore, Maryland.  (List 2011–present)

See also 
 Primonetta Stakes
 List of graded stakes at Pimlico Race Course

References

Pimlico Race Course